GNOME Calculator, formerly known as gcalctool, is the software calculator integrated with the GNOME desktop environment. It is programmed in C and Vala and part of the GNOME Core Applications.

Views
 Basic – interface for basic arithmetic, resembling a desk calculator.
 Advanced – an interface with scientific functions, and support for custom variables.
 Financial – financial calculation and currency conversion.
 Programming – a view with bit manipulation operators and radix conversion.
 Keyboard – most of the space is taken up by the output, with no on-screen buttons. Supports currency and unit conversion.

Notation
The GNOME calculator uses the common infix notation for binary functions, such as the four basic arithmetic operations. Unlike many other calculators, it uses prefix notation, not postfix notation for unary functions. So to calculate e.g. the sine of one, the user must push the keys , not , as on many other calculators.

The decimal separator on the number pad is based on the general keyboard layout since version 3.12.3.

Variable handling

Variable names are case-sensitive alphabetical string without spaces. Variable values are numerical strings.

Values are assigned to variable names by entering in the GUI text input/result field a variable name followed by 0 or more spaces, followed by the  character, followed by 0 or more spaces, followed by either a numeric value or an existing variable name, e.g. "x = 2" or "result = subtotal" (if subtotal was already assigned a numeric value). A numeric value is assigned to the first variable name. If the value was entered as an existing variable name rather than as a numeric value, the existing variable's value is assigned to the first variable name. Assignment to a variable name that does not exist creates the new variable by name with the assigned value.

Entering a variable name into the GUI text field substitutes the variable value for the variable name when the expression in the GUI text field is evaluated (e.g. when the keyboard  button or the  GUI button is pressed). The  (insert variable) GUI button shows a popup menu of existing variables (and the current value of each); the selected variable name is inserted (appended) into the GUI text field.

Variable names and values persist between launch and quit of the application.

See also
 Comparison of software calculators
 KCalc

References

External links

 

Software calculators
GNOME Core Applications
Software that uses GTK
Software that uses Meson
Free software programmed in C
Free software programmed in Vala